Pukara (Aymara and Quechua for fortress, Hispanicized spelling Pucara) is a mountain in the Wansu mountain range in the Andes of Peru, about  high. It is situated in the Arequipa Region, Condesuyos Province, Cayarani District. Pukara lies southeast of Yana Yana.

References 

Mountains of Peru
Mountains of Arequipa Region